is one of the countries that existed in the Japanese archipelago in the 3rd century.

Outline 
According to The History of the Three Kingdoms, Wei's Dongyi biography, commonly known as Wajin Biography, and History of the Northern Dynasties. According to Nukoku (or Itokoku), Fiya-guni (不彌國) is located 100 ri east of Nukoku, and its chief is called Tamomi and its deputy is called Hinamori, with over 1000 houses.
The chief is called Tamomi and his deputy is called Hinamori, and there are more than 1,000 families.

There is little difference between the various theories regarding the route from Tsushima Province to Nukuni, but the location of Toumakoku and Yamataikoku differ greatly between the Kyushu and Honshu theories, and according to the direct route theory, Fumikoku is the route to these two countries. Therefore, the location of Fumikoku is the dividing line between the Kyushu and Honshu theory.

In addition, the fact that the article on "" is different from the articles on the journey to other countries and is heterogeneous . In addition, since there are no articles on land travel by water or Toumadoku in the oldest extant record of Wei Xuan, there is a theory that these articles were mixed in when it was copied later, and that it actually only went south from Fumikuni to Yamataikuni.。

Furthermore, the article on "Overland and Oversea Routes" is distinct from other travel records to foreign countries. In the oldest surviving record, the "Weilüe," there is no mention of overland and oversea routes or the country of Tobamare, leading some to believe that these articles were added in later copies and that in reality, the journey was simply a southward journey from Fumi no Kuni to Yamatai.

Hinamori 
Hinamori, also known as "夷守" in Japanese, is a term that has a historical significance in ancient Japan. It refers to the act of protecting a borderland or important land that is far away from the capital. The term also refers to the place or person who is responsible for such protection.

Ancient title 
In ancient texts such as the "Wajinden", the term Hinamori is mentioned as a crucial aspect of defending the country from external invasions. Some places in Japan still carry this name as a part of their geographical name, such as the city of Kobayashi. This city is situated on the periphery of a basin, surrounded by hills and mountains that reach heights of 300 meters above sea level. To the south of the city is the Kirishima volcano group, to the north is the Kyushu mountain range, and to the east and west are hilly areas that border the Tsukushi and Kakuto basins. Historically, this area was considered a borderland and was called Hina-mori, as mentioned in the "Engishiki" and was controlled by the Satsuma clan and the Shimazu clan in more recent times.

Modern usage 
In modern times, the term can also refer to the city of Kobayashi in Japan. The city is situated on the periphery of a basin, surrounded by hills and mountains that reach heights of 300 meters above sea level. To the south of the city is the Kirishima volcano group, to the north is the Kyushu mountain range, and to the east and west are hilly areas that border the Tsukushi and Kakuto basins. Historically, this area was considered a borderland and was called Hina-mori, as mentioned in the "Engishiki" and was controlled by the Satsuma clan and the Shimazu clan in more recent times.

See also 
 Wa (Japan)
 Wajin (ancient people)
 History of the Northern Dynasties

Annotations

Footnotes

References 

Former countries in Japanese history
History of the Kyushu region
Wajinden
States of the Wajinden
Pages with unreviewed translations